Koteeswaran is a 1955 Indian Tamil-language comedy film co-written, co-produced, edited and directed by Sundar Rao Nadkarni. The film stars Sivaji Ganesan, Padmini, S. Balachander and Ragini. Based on B. V. Warerkar's Marathi play Haach Mulacha Baap, it revolves around two friends setting out to fight against the dowry system in their village. The film was released on 13 November 1955.

Plot 

Chandar and Kannan are two friends. They return to their village after completing their studies, but are shocked by the prevalence of the dowry system. They both set out to fight against it.

Cast 

Male cast
 Sivaji Ganesan as Doctor Chandar
 S. Balachander as Pasupathy
 Sriram as Kannan
 K. A. Thangavelu as Rao Bahadur Ramasami
 Sirukalathur Sama as Jakamba
 Sattam Pillai Venkatraman as Rangu Pillai
 A. Ganesh Singh as Servant Karuppan

Female cast
 Padmini as Neela
 Ragini as Kamala
 Rushyendramani as Parvathi
 Baby Saraswathi as Usha
 Baby Rajakumari as Rani
Male support cast
 M. A. Ganapathi Bhat, S. V. Shanmugam, Vijaymani.

Production 
Koteeswaran is based on Haach Mulacha Baap, a Marathi play written by B. V. Warerkar. It was directed by Sundar Rao Nadkarni who also produced the film with B. Radhakrishna under Sri Ganesh Movietone, and wrote the screenplay alongside Kangeyan. The dialogues were written by Thanjai N. Ramaiah Dass and Kangeyan. Cinematography was handled by G. K. Ramu, the art direction by D. S. Kotkavngar and the editing by Nadkarni.

Soundtrack 
The music was composed by S. V. Venkatraman. The lyrics were written by Papanasam Sivan, Thanjai N. Ramaiah Dass, Gemini Seetharaman and T. K. Sundhara Vathiyar.

Release and reception 
Koteeswaran was released on 13 November 1955, Diwali day. The Indian Express wrote, "Crisp and spicy dialogue is the highlight" of the film.

References

External links 
 

1950s Tamil-language films
1955 comedy films
1955 films
Films scored by S. V. Venkatraman
Indian comedy films
Indian films based on plays